Innovia can refer to:

 Innovia Films Ltd, a British plastic-film manufacturer
 Bombardier Innovia, formerly Adtranz Innovia, a family of people-mover systems